Rebecca Cole is a British make-up artist. She was nominated for an Academy Award in the category Best Makeup and Hairstyling for the film 1917.

Selected filmography 
 1917 (2019; co-nominated with Naomi Donne and Tristan Versluis)

References

External links 

Living people
Year of birth missing (living people)
Place of birth missing (living people)
British make-up artists